Deian Cristian Sorescu (born 29 August 1997) is a Romanian professional footballer who plays as a winger or a right-back for Liga I club FCSB, on loan from Ekstraklasa club Raków Częstochowa, and the Romania national team.

A youth player of Politehnica Timișoara until its dissolution in 2012, he started his senior career with the two entities which asserted the history of the defunct team—ACS Poli Timișoara and ASU Politehnica Timișoara. In 2018, Sorescu left the latter to sign for Dinamo București, amassing over 120 matches in the top flight before moving abroad to Raków Częstochowa four years later.

Internationally, Sorescu was given his debut for the Romania senior team in June 2021, in a 2–1 friendly loss to Georgia.

Club career

Early career / ACS Poli Timișoara
Born in Moldova Nouă, Caraș-Severin County, Sorescu played football for local club Dunărea Moldova Nouă before joining the youth setup of FC Politehnica Timișoara, aged ten. After the dissolution of FC Politehnica, he moved to newly-founded ACS Poli Timișoara in 2012. At age 16, Sorescu was loaned out to Romanian third division team Millenium Giarmata, after which he became part of the extended roster for the ACS Poli senior team. 

On 30 May 2015, Sorescu made his debut for the Alb-violeții in a 1–1 Liga II draw with Olimpia Satu Mare. Towards the end of the following season, he played his maiden minutes in the first league in games against Petrolul Ploiești and CSM Studențesc Iași; both ended in 2–3 defeats.

ASU Politehnica Timișoara
At the start of 2017, Sorescu moved to ASU Politehnica Timișoara, the other team in the city established after the dissolution of the original FC Politehnica. He made his breakthrough in the 2017–18 Liga II campaign, amassing 14 goals and 35 matches in all competitions.

Dinamo București
Liga I club Dinamo București signed Sorescu on a four-year contract on 27 April 2018. He registered his debut for "the Red Dogs" on 22 July that year, and also scored the winner in the 2–1 home league victory over Voluntari. With eleven goals in all competitions, Sorescu was Dinamo București's top scorer in the 2019–20 season. 

He repeated the performance the next year, this time after netting only eight goals, and was chosen by Liga Profesionistă de Fotbal in the 2020–21 Liga I Team of the Season. On 19 July 2021, Sorescu scored a hat-trick in the campaign's opener against Voluntari, with the game ending in a 3–2 win. During that summer, he was subject to offers from Legia Warsaw and Dinamo's city rivals FCSB.

Raków Częstochowa
On 19 January 2022, Dinamo București announced the transfer of Sorescu to Raków Częstochowa, and two days later the Polish team confirmed the signing of a three-and-a-half-year deal. He registered his Ekstraklasa debut on 12 February, in a 1–0 away victory over Radomiak Radom. On 2 May that year, he won his first career trophy after starting in a 3–1 defeat of Lech Poznań in the Polish Cup final.

Loan to FCSB
On 14 January 2023, Sorescu rejoined the Romanian league by signing for FCSB on loan until the end of the season. He made his debut for the Roș-albaștrii eight days later, in a 1–0 away win over Hermannstadt, and scored his first goal in a 2–1 victory against Argeș Pitești on 26 February.

International career
Sorescu made his debut for the Romania national team on 2 June 2021, in a friendly against Georgia at the Ilie Oană Stadium in Ploiești. He started as a right-back and provided an assist to Andrei Ivan in the 1–2 loss.

Career statistics

Club

International

Honours
Raków Częstochowa
Polish Cup: 2021–22
Polish Super Cup: 2022

Individual
Liga I Team of the Season: 2020–21

References

External links

1997 births
Living people
People from Moldova Nouă
Romanian footballers
Association football wingers
Association football fullbacks
Liga I players
Liga II players
Liga III players
ACS Poli Timișoara players
SSU Politehnica Timișoara players
FC Dinamo București players
Ekstraklasa players
Raków Częstochowa players
FC Steaua București players
Romania under-21 international footballers
Romania international footballers
Romanian expatriate footballers
Expatriate footballers in Poland
Romanian expatriates in Poland